Čvrsnica is a mountain in the Dinarides of Bosnia and Herzegovina, located in northern Herzegovina. Most of the mountain is located in the Herzegovina-Neretva Canton municipalities of Mostar and Jablanica, while the smaller part of the mountain, around 10% is located in the municipality of Posušje. The highest peak (Pločno) is 2228 metres.

Čvrsnica is surrounded by the river Neretva from the east (20 km), its tributaries Doljanka (18 km) from the north and Drežanka (19.8 km) from the south, the Dugo Polje field (12 km) and Vran mountain from west. The mountain consists of several plateaus — Plasa and Muharnica on north, Mala Čvrsnica on south. There are more than ten summits above 2000 m (Pločno 2228 m, Veliki Jelinak 2179 m, Veliki Vilinac 2118 m, etc.), vertical cliffs (Pesti brdo, Mezica stijene, Strmenica ...). It also includes lakes of Blidinje, Crepulja and Crvenjak. The Diva Grabovica canyon (6.2 km) goes into the mountain.

Bio-life is characteristic of its three climate areas: conifers above 1200 m, plateau with grass and junipers; numerous endemic species (like Munika Pine). Čvrsnica is well known as a home of chamois.

Climate
The mountain exhibits three types of climate: Mediterranean at the base of the mountain, central European on hillsides and alpine on summits and plateaus. Six months have average temperatures below zero degrees Celsius. January and February have 15–23 days of snow precipitation. Snow layer thickness can be 2.5–3 m. Strong wind can make snowdrifts even 15 m thick. The upper plateau is under the snow from November until April — in hidden parts snow remains whole year.

Trivia 
Hajdučka Republika Mijata Tomića, a self-proclaimed micronation, the parodical project, is located between this mountain and the mountain Vran.

References

Mountains of the Federation of Bosnia and Herzegovina
Two-thousanders of Bosnia and Herzegovina
Mountains of Bosnia and Herzegovina